Survive is the second full-length studio album by Much the Same. It was released on August 29, 2006, by Nitro Records and is the last album by the band before their breakup.

Track listing
 "The Greatest Betrayal" – 2:36
 "American Idle" – 3:13
 "Gut Shot" – 3:16
 "What I Know" – 3:11
 "Take What's Yours" – 2:34
 "Skeletons" – 3:38
 "For Those Left Behind" – 3:14
 "Living a Lie" – 1:09
 "Stitches" – 3:50
 "Wrecking Ball" – 2:41
 "Picking Up the Shattered Pieces" – 2:56
 "Seasons Change" (feat. Nick Diener of The Swellers)  Japanese bonus track

Personnel 
 Gunner McGrath – Lead Vocals, Guitar, Piano
 Franky Tsoukalas – Bass, Vocals
 Dan O'Gorman – Guitar
 Jevin Kaye – Drums
 Cameron Webb – Producer, Engineer, Mixing
 Zoli Teglas – Additional Vocals
 Andy Lareau – Vocals, Additional Engineering, Guitar
 Mark Michalik – Additional Engineering
 Jared Rohde – Vocals
 Ed Perry – Gang Vocals
 Joey Ciola – Gang Vocals

Japanese edition 
This album was released on January 10, 2007, on Radtone Music in Japan. This edition contains a bonus track entitled "Seasons Change", which features Nick Diener of The Swellers adding additional vocals and guitar.

2006 albums
Much the Same albums